Chaim Zanvl Abramowitz (born 1902 – died 18 October 1995), was known as the Ribnitzer Rebbe, and considered a great Hasidic tzadik from Rybnitsa (present-day Transnistria, Moldova). Others, including singer Mordechai Ben David, who was one of the rabbi's close disciples, maintain that he was born in 1893, making him 102 at the time of his passing.

Abramowitz was a prominent follower of Rabbi Avrohom Matisyohu of Shtefanesht.

He managed to live a fully Jewish religious life even under Stalin's rule. He served as mohel and shochet. He often fasted and immersed himself many times daily in water that was sometimes only accessible by chopping away very thick ice. His Tikkun Chatzos (midnight prayer service) in sackcloth and ashes regularly lasted 6–7 hours, sometimes stretching as long as 12. He cried so much during Tikkun Chatzos that when he was done, the tears and ashes mingled so that he was sitting in mud.

Abramowitz left the Soviet Union in 1970 and moved to the Mattersdorf section of Jerusalem, where he lived for a few years before moving to the United States. He lived in Miami, Los Angeles, and Sea Gate, Brooklyn, before he finally settled in Monsey, New York, where he died on Isru Chag (Succos). He was believed to be 92 or 93 years old. He is buried in the Vizhnitzer Cemetery. Nearly 30,000 people visited his gravesite on his 23rd yahrtzeit.

References

External links
 Profile,; accessed 22 June 2017. 
 Video of The Ribnitzer saying sheva brachos, mahnishmah.com; accessed 22 June 2017.
 Jungreis, Esther. "There Are No Accidents ... "A story is told about the Ribnitzer Rebbe...", hineni.org; accessed 22 June 2017.
 A message from MBD, the3ms.co.uk; accessed 22 June 2017.

1902 births
1995 deaths
People with acquired American citizenship
People from Monsey, New York
Hasidic rebbes
Romanian Orthodox rabbis
American Hasidic rabbis
Hasidic rabbis in Europe
Moldovan Orthodox rabbis
Ukrainian Hasidic rabbis
American people of Romanian-Jewish descent
American people of Ukrainian-Jewish descent
Soviet emigrants to Israel
Israeli emigrants to the United States
Israeli Hasidic rabbis
People from Botoșani
Transnistrian people
People from Sea Gate, Brooklyn
Mohels